Antonio María Barbieri, O.F.M. Cap. (October 12, 1892 – July 6, 1979), born Alfredo Barbieri, was an Uruguayan cardinal of the Catholic Church. He served as Archbishop of Montevideo from 1940 to 1976, and was elevated to the cardinalate.

Biography
Alfredo Barbieri was born in Montevideo to José and Mariana (née Romano) Barbieri. He had a hesitant start to his ecclesiastical career as his parents were strongly opposed to him becoming a priest, and before eventually entering the religious life Barbieri worked as an insurance clerk. He joined the Order of Friars Minor Capuchin on December 8, 1913, and later moved to Genoa, Italy to continue his novitiate in 1915. Receiving the habit on the following September 8, Barbieri made his solemn profession and took the name Antonio María.

He then attended Capuchin houses of study and the Pontifical Gregorian University in Rome. Barbieri was ordained on December 17, 1921, and obtained his doctorate in theology from the Gregorian on July 9, 1923. He declined a professorship at a prestigious university in Rome and returned to Uruguay, where he served as a pastor in the local Capuchin friary. He was elected superior of this mission in 1931 and re-elected five years later.

On October 6, 1936, Barbieri was appointed coadjutor bishop of Montevideo and titular bishop of Macra. He received his episcopal consecration on the following November 8 from Archbishop Filippo, with Archbishop Giovanni Aragone and Bishop Alfredo Violas serving as co-consecrators.

Barbieri succeeded Aragone as Archbishop of Montevideo on November 20, 1940. Besides his skill in theology, he was also a noted historian, violinist, and essayist. Barbieri was a close associate of Carlos Carmelo Vasconcellos Motta when the first episcopal conferences of Latin American bishops began in the mid-1950s. Pope John XXIII created Barbieri cardinal priest of S. Crisogno in the consistory of December 15, 1958, and he thus became the first Uruguayan cardinal.

He was one of the cardinal electors in the 1963 conclave, participated in the Second Vatican Council (1962–1965), and during the 1960s was recognized for his long periods of service as a theologian and historian with his promotion to the Instituto Histórico y Geográfico del Uruguay (Historical and Geographical Institute of Uruguay). Barbieri resigned as Montevideo's archbishop on November 17, 1976, after thirty-five years of service. When he turned eighty in 1972, however, the Cardinal was not permitted to attend any future conclaves, and he died quietly less than a year into Pope John Paul II's pontificate, at age 86.

References

External links
 Cardinals of the Holy Roman Church
 
  

1892 births
1979 deaths
Bishops appointed by Pope Pius XI
20th-century Roman Catholic archbishops in Uruguay
People from Montevideo
Capuchin cardinals
Uruguayan cardinals
Capuchins
Pontifical Gregorian University alumni
Participants in the Second Vatican Council
Cardinals created by Pope John XXIII
Burials at Montevideo Metropolitan Cathedral
Uruguayan people of Italian descent
Members of the Uruguayan Academy of Language
Uruguayan Roman Catholic archbishops
Roman Catholic archbishops of Montevideo
Uruguayan expatriates in Italy